Homonoia is the concept of order and unity, being of one mind together or union of hearts. It was used by the Greeks to create unity in the politics of classical Greece.  It saw widespread use when Alexander the Great adopted its principles to govern his vast Empire.

Interpretation

Classical Greeks
The concept of Homonoia was an ancient Greek concept which traditionally was not applied beyond their own culture.  The Greeks viewed Homonoia as an absence of factional fighting in their city states. The Greeks viewed outside cultures as "barbarians".  The famed scholar Aristotle once told his student, a young Alexander the Great, "treat Greeks as friends, but [non-Greeks] as animals."

It was the scholar Isocrates who first looked beyond the Greek people.  While he didn't preach that the savages of the non-Greek world could be on par with the superior Greek people, he did believe they could be made Greek and thus be of one mind together.  He claimed that Greekness could become a matter of nurture rather than nature. It was during his time spent in the court of Philip II of Macedon that Isocrates was able to teach the concept to an influential audience.  Philip II took much of the concept to heart, but he too viewed it as a method reserved for the Greeks. He used the concept as his driving force behind creating the Corinthian League, an alliance to unite the Greek States for a war against the Persian Empire.  After Philip II was assassinated, his son Alexander the Great became King of Macedonia and himself became a proponent of Homonoia.

Alexander the Great

Alexander's tutor, Aristotle, viewed non-Greeks as barbarian animals. Alexander however, ignored his teacher's indication and expanded on the concept of Homonoia.  With an Empire covering most of the known world, Alexander sought to rule his subjects, whether they were Greek, Persian or Egyptian, under the concept of Homonoia. In his short time as ruler of his vast Empire he tried to adopt customs of the cultures he conquered such as Persian dress and customs at his court, notably the custom of proskynesis, either a symbolic kissing of the hand, or prostration on the ground, that Persians paid to their social superiors. He also married the officers of his army to Persian wives in an effort to further create a sense of oneness in his new Empire. Through his policies he wanted to create a new Greco-Oriental empire as distinct from the more traditional system of a small ruling class of conquerors ruling over the recently vanquished.  It was his practice to place the old style Persian satrap as governors but in the newly created offices of taxation and finance he placed Macedonians. After his death most of his reforms lived on even as the Empire fragmented into successor states.

In the Romanized East
Homonoia was extended under Roman rule in the highly urbanized East as a symbolic mechanism for dealing with intra-city tensions and for linking the sometimes intensely individual eastern city-states. A temple of Homonoia at Aphrodisias in Caria appears as the setting for the wedding of Callirhoe and Dionysios in the first-century CE romance Chaereas and Callirhoe; the temple is objectified in coinage of Aphrodisias that shows the cult statue of Aphrodite of Aphrodisias with those of other cities, under the legend homonoia: "Deities in the coin issues served as symbols that mediated the power within regional alliances, bolstered the prestige of the divine realm in human activity and provided the glue that bound together the political and the cosmic spheres." In the first century CE, the Greek rhetor Dio Chrysostom sought in one of his Discourses to establish homonoia between two cities that each claimed the sobriquet "first city", Nicaea and Nicopolis.

See also

Homonoia Greek goddess of order and unity

Bibliography

Notes

References
 - Total pages: 608 

 - Total pages: 313 

 - Total pages: 289 
 - Total pages: 476 
 - Total pages: 300 

Ethical schools and movements
Theories in ancient Greek philosophy
Political theories